This is a list of the Iran national football team's competitive records.

Individual records

Appearances
 Most capped players
As of 29 November 2022, the players with the most caps for Iran are:

The records are collected based on data from FIFA and RSSSF. bold names denotes a player still playing or available for selection.

 Most capped goalkeepers

 World Cup appearances
Ehsan Hajsafi, 9 Games, 2014, 2018, 2022
Alireza Jahanbakhsh, 8 Games, 2014, 2018, 2022
Mehdi Mahdavikia, 6 Games, 1998, 2006
Andranik Teymourian, 6 Games, 2006, 2014 

 World Cup event appearances
Masoud Shojaei, 3 World Cups, 2006, 2014, 2018

 Oldest player to feature at the World Cup  Ali Daei, 37 years, 2006
 Youngest player to feature at the World Cup  Hossein Kaebi, 20 years and 9 months, 2006.

 Oldest player to feature at the Asian Cup  Ali Daei, 35 years, 2004
 First appearance by a player who had never played for an Iranian club  Ferydoon Zandi, vs  Bahrain on 9 February 2005
 First player to debut as a substitute  Mohammad Mohajer, on 25 August 1941 vs Afghanistan

Goals
 Top goalscorers

 First goal  Masoud Boroumand vs , Friendly, 26 October 1947	

 Most goals in a match
 
Karim Bagheri, 7 goals vs , 2 June 1997 (1998 World Cup qualification)
 
Karim Bagheri, 6 goals vs , 24 November 2000 (2002 World Cup Qualification)
 
Ali Daei, 5 goals vs , 12 June 1996 (1996 AFC Asian Cup qualification)
 
 Four goals in a match
 
Behtash Fariba vs , 22 September 1980 (1980 AFC Asian Cup)
Nasser Mohammadkhani vs , 7 August 1984 (1984 AFC Asian Cup qualification);
Ali Asghar Modir Roosta vs , 25 June 1993 (1994 World Cup qualification)
Ali Daei vs , 10 June 1996 (1996 AFC Asian Cup qualification)
Ali Daei vs , 16 December 1996 (1996 AFC Asian Cup)
Ali Karimi vs , 24 November 2000 (2002 World Cup qualification)
Ali Daei vs , 17 November 2004 (2006 World Cup qualification)
Karim Ansarifard vs , 11 October 2019 (2022 World Cup qualification)

 Three goals in a match 
Masoud Boroumand vs , 27 October 50
Abbas Hajari vs , 14 December 1959 (1960 AFC Asian Cup qualification)
Ali Jabbari vs , 12 March 1o69
Hossein Kalani vs , 9 May 1972 (1972 AFC Asian Cup)
Ali Jabbari vs , 13 May 1972 (1972 AFC Asian Cup)
Gholam Hossein Mazloumi vs , 3 September 1974 (1974 Asian Games)
Gholam Hossein Mazloumi vs , 8 June 1976 (1976 AFC Asian Cup)
Karim Bavi vs , 4 June 1988 (1988 AFC Asian Cup qualification)
Farshad Pious vs , 24 September 1990 (1990 Asian Games)
Karim Bagheri vs , 17 June 1996 (1996 AFC Asian Cup qualification)
Hamid Estili vs , 2 June 1997 (1998 World Cup qualification)
Ali Daei vs , 14 December 1998 (1998 Asian Games)
Ali Daei vs , 31 March 2000 (2000 AFC Asian Cup qualification)
Ali Daei vs , 24 November 2000 (2002 World Cup qualification)
Farhad Majidi vs , 24 November 2000 (2002 World Cup qualification)
Sirous Dinmohammadi vs , 8 August 2001
Ali Karimi vs , 15 August 2001
Ali Daei vs , 17 June 2004 (2004 WAFF West Asian Championship)
Ali Karimi vs , 31 July 2004 (2004 AFC Asian Cup)
Javad Nekounam vs , 6 February 2013 (2015 AFC Asian Cup qualification)
Sardar Azmoun vs , 2 June 2016
Mehdi Taremi vs , 6 June 2019
Sardar Azmoun vs , 11 October 2019 (2022 World Cup qualification)

 First goal in a World Cup match  Iraj Danaeifard, 1978 FIFA World Cup vs 
 First goal in a World Cup qualifying campaign  Gholam Vafakhah vs , 6 May 1973 (1974 World Cup qualification)
 Oldest goalscorer at the World Cup  Yahya Golmohammadi, 35 years, 2006
 Youngest goalscorer at the World Cup  Mehdi Mahdavikia, 20 years, 1998
 Oldest goalscorer at the Asian Cup  Ali Daei, 35 years, 2004
 Most goals scored from penalties  Ali Daei 16 Goals. 
 Youngest goalscorer  Allahyar Sayyadmanesh, 17 years and 342 days, 2019
 First goal by a substitute  First Iranian goalscorer at the Azadi Stadium  : Parviz Ghelichkhani vs  Australia 24 August 1973

 Hat-tricks

Team records

Biggest Wins

Biggest Defeats

Top Results
Include only official results.

Biggest Wins

108 Win with +3 and more / 75 Win with only +2 / 134 Win with only +1

Biggest Defeats

16 Defeat with -3 and more / 25 Defeat with only -2 / 67 Defeat with only -1

Biggest Draws

PSO matches
PSO: 8 Matches in AFC Asian Cup - 4 Matches in Asian Games - Some of Matches in others Tournaments.

Source:

AET matches

AET: Only matches that result defined in overtime (without penalty kicks).

Home matches 
As of 10 November 2022

Consecutive Win Matches

10 Wins (World Record: Germany 15 Wins):

Consecutive Unbeaten Matches

18 Matches (World Record - Longest Unbeaten Streaks: Italy 37 / Argentina 36 / Algeria 35 / Spain 35 / Brazil 35):

Competition records

FIFA World Cup

Olympic Games

AFC Asian Cup

Asian Games

WAFF Championship

1 Iran played their B team in this tournament

Minor competitions

RCD Cup/ECO Cup

 consist of only official international "A" Senior matches (not including Iran match with Turkey XI in 1970 RCD Cup and Malavan F.C. matches with Turkey and Pakistan in 1974 RCD Cup).

LG Cup Four Nations Tournament

consists of only official international "A" Senior matches (not including Youth, B Team and club team results).
Source: https://www.rsssf.org/tablesl/lgcup.html
 Third Place Match [Jun 1]  Iran did not play Ghana [Iran waited for 35 minutes on the pitch, while Ghana did not show up at all, apparently demanding prize money for the fourth-place finishers (uncommon in LG tournaments).  Eventually Iran left, without obtaining any information from the Nigerian 'organisers'.  One day later, the Nigerian FA awarded Ghana third place (and the relevant prize money) because Iran had left the pitch (sic!).  Iran have protested.]
 apparently only 2 matches were played ([Oct 4] Iraq 0–2 Iran and [Oct 6] Jordan 0–0 Iran), structure of tournament unclear.

Minor Tournament

consist of only official international "A" Senior matches (not including Youth, B Team and club team results).
Quaid-E-Azam International Cup
1985 Nehru Cup
1999 Ciao February Cup
2001 Civilization Cup
2005 Tehran Cup

Special Tournament
Two Tournament for A team but Iran sent B team and club team.

 all matches is unofficial international "A" Senior matches.

Special Friendly Match

Friendly Match Results
This table consist of only 2 sided team friendly match results (not including 3 and 4 nations cup and other friendly and Minor Tournament). Also only official international "A" Senior matches (not including Youth, B Team and club team results).
 As of 11 November 2016

Summary

The list shown below shows the Iran national football team all-time international record against opposing nations.

Head-to-head records

 FIFA considers Russia as the inheritor of the records of Soviet Union.
 FIFA considers Serbia as the inheritor of the records of SFR Yugoslavia and FR Yugoslavia.
 FIFA considers Czech Republic as the inheritor of the records of Czechoslovakia.

All Time General Statistics Record / Overview of Results

consists of only official international "A" Senior matches (not including Youth, B Team and club team results).

Excluding 2019 AFC Asian Cup Qual matches as they are counted in FIFA World Cup Qual (2018).
consists of only 2 sided team friendly match results (not including 3 and 4 nations cup and other friendly and Minor Tournament).

FIFA World Ranking records 

 Highest FIFA ranking  15 (July 2005)
 Lowest FIFA ranking  122 (May 1996)
 Best mover  65 (July 1996)
 Worst mover  -43 (October 1995)

Unofficial matches

Matches against clubs not listed.

1940s

1950s

1960s

1970s

1980s

1990s

2000s

2010s

2020s

References

External links
Team Melli records 
 FIFA.com
 RSSSF archive of Iran's results, by Majeed Panahi, RSSSF, 21 Jan 2006
 World Football Elo Ratings: Iran

 
National association football team records and statistics